Lékoni is a town in south eastern Gabon, lying east of Bongoville on the Lekoni River, surrounded by the Batéké Plateau. It is known for the Léconi Canyons (actually craters) and Léconi Park, a private wildlife park also involved in agriculture.

Populated places in Haut-Ogooué Province